Akropolis is the biggest shopping center in Klaipėda and the sixth largest shopping mall  in Lithuania with 76,410 m2 (820,000 sq ft). It was built by the Lithuanian company AB "Vilniaus Akropolis" (headed by Mindaugas Marcinkevičius) in 2005. It was built Taikos pr. 61.  On the  side of the building there is a four-level free car park. The entertainment area featuring an Olympic-sized ice arena, several restaurants, 6 cinema halls, bowling, casinos and other entertainment venues. There are grocery stores, Maxima LT supermarket, 244 shops etc. The mall also has bookstores. Owner is  AKROPOLIS GROUP, UAB.

See also 
 List of shopping malls in Lithuania

External links 

 Website (lt, en)

References

Shopping malls in Klaipėda
Commercial buildings completed in 2005